Austria has participated in the Eurovision Song Contest 54 times since its debut in . The contest is broadcast in Austria by ORF.

This was Austria's only top three result of the 20th century. Austria has finished last in the contest final seven times (1957, 1961, 1962, 1979, 1984, 1988 and 1991) and finished last in the semifinal in 2012. Cesár Sampson achieved Austria's eighth top five result and second-best result of the 21st century at the  contest, finishing third with the song "Nobody but You".

History
This would be Austria's only top three result of 20th century. Austria has finished last in the final a total of seven times, in 1957, 1961, 1962, 1979, 1984, 1988, 1991. The country also finished last in the semi-final in 2012.

Austria achieved its second victory in the contest at the  contest, with Conchita Wurst winning with 290 points. In a complete reversal of fortunes in 2015, following a tie-break rule Austria was placed 26th and scored nul points along with Germany (27th), they became the first countries since the United Kingdom in 2003 to score nul points at the final. Because of this, Austria became the first host country to receive nul points. Austria qualified for the final for the next three years, finishing 13th in 2016, 16th in 2017 and in 2018, when "Nobody but You" by Cesár Sampson finished third. The country's fortunes were once again reversed afterwards, with Paenda (2019), Vincent Bueno (2021) and Lumix feat. Pia Maria (2022) failing to qualify for the final.

Absences
Austria has opted out of participation in several Contests. The first of these was the 1969 Contest, which was staged in Madrid. As Spain was ruled at that time by Francisco Franco, Austria chose to boycott the Contest. Contest historian John Kennedy O'Connor points out, however, that Austria had given Spain two points in the previous event and since Spain only won by one point, the political protest was perhaps disingenuous.

The following year, Austria was again absent. This was due to the unprecedented result in 1969 in which four songs tied for first place, a result which prompted several other countries to opt out as well.

From 1973 to 1975, Austria stayed away as well. The exact reason for this is unclear, however the scoring system in use at one of these Contests - allowing all entrants a guaranteed number of points - may have been a factor.

The country was ineligible to compete in 1998 and 2001, as it had not achieved sufficiently high placings in the five previous years.

Prior to the 2006 contest, Austria announced that they would not enter a performer in protest at their poor results in previous years, arguing that the musical talent of the performers was no longer the determining factor in Contest success. They returned for the 2007 contest in Helsinki, but came second to last in the semi-final.  National broadcaster ORF cited the 2007 result, as well as declining interest in the Contest among Austrian viewers, as the reason Austria would not return to the contest in 2008. ORF programme director Wolfgang Lorenz also hinted that Austria may withdraw from the contest indefinitely, stating "ORF has no desire to send more talent out of Austria to a competition where they have no chances...Should the situation change, we'll be happy to take part again".
  Despite withdrawing, the final of the 2008 contest was screened on ORF.

In 2008, the EBU introduced two semi-finals to the contest, hoping that spreading countries out by random draw would prevent the kind of bloc voting that had warded Austria off. Additionally, they reintroduced juries to determine 50% of each country's result in 2009 (albeit not in the semi-finals, in which all but one of the qualifiers were decided entirely by televote). However, Edgar Böhm, director of entertainment for ORF, said that the semi-final format "still incorporates a mix of countries who will be politically favoured in the voting process" and "that, unless a clear guideline as to how the semifinals are organised is made by the EBU, Austria will not be taking part in Moscow 2009". ORF decided not to participate in the 2009 contest, but did broadcast the final as in 2008. The EBU announced that they would work harder to bring Austria back to the contest in 2010, along with former participants Monaco and Italy. It was, however, confirmed that Austria would not participate in the 2010 Contest in Oslo. In July 2010, the chairman of ORF, Alexander Wrabetz, stated that Austria would return for the 2011 contest, due to it being held in its neighbour Germany. In 2011, Austria reached the final for the first time since 2004.

Participation overview

Hostings

Awards

Marcel Bezençon Awards

Related involvement

Conductors

Heads of delegation

Commentators and spokespersons

Grissemann admitted to future German commentator Peter Urban in 1995 that he only stayed for the dress rehearsal and then provided the Austrian commentary live from the ORF studios. After 1998 Grissemann stepped down from the commentary and was replaced by Andi Knoll. Austria has also broadcast the contests which it did not compete in, except for the  contest.

Photogallery

See also
Austria in Eurovision Choir – A competition organised by the EBU for non-professional choirs.
Austria in the Eurovision Dance Contest – Dance version of the Eurovision Song Contest.
Austria in the Eurovision Young Dancers – A competition organised by the EBU for younger dancers aged between 16 and 21.
Austria in the Eurovision Young Musicians – A competition organised by the EBU for musicians aged 18 years and younger.

Notes and references

Notes

References

External links 
Independent Eurovision Song Contest site from Austria
Lyrics for all Austrian entries
Points to and from Austria eurovisioncovers.co.uk

 
Countries in the Eurovision Song Contest